Three hundred and twenty-one scholars and artists were awarded Guggenheim Fellowships in 1959. More than $1,500,000 was disbursed, averaging about $3,000 per recipient.

1959 U.S. and Canadian Fellows

1959 Latin American and Caribbean oFellows

See also
 Guggenheim Fellowship
 List of Guggenheim Fellowships awarded in 1958
 List of Guggenheim Fellowships awarded in 1960

References

1959
1959 awards